Convoy QP 3 — was one of Arctic convoys of World War II which sailed between the United Kingdom, United States, or Iceland to what was then the USSR.

Description
This small oceanic slow-speed special convoy sailed from Arkhangelsk in the Soviet Union on 27 November 1941. It called at Seyðisfjörður in Iceland, and reached its final destination — Kirkwall, Scotland — on 3 December 1941.

Convoy makeup

Cargo ships
 British cargo ships
  (6978/1941) – reached Kirkwall on 13 December 1941
  (5486/1932) – reached Kirkwall on 13 December 1941
  (5082/1934) – reached Kirkwall on 13 December 1941
  (5095/1940) – reached Kirkwall on 13 December 1941
  (4814/1924) – reached Kirkwall on 13 December 1941
  (5138/1940) – reached Kirkwall on 13 December 1941
 Soviet cargo ships
 Andre Marti (2352/1918) – reached Kirkwall on 9 December 1941
 Arcos (2343/1918) – returned to Arkhangelsk on 29 November 1941
 Kuzbass (3109/1914) – returned to Arkhangelsk on 29 November 1941
 Revolutsioner (2900/1936) – reached Kirkwall on 9 December 1941

Escort 
 Cruisers and destroyers
  – destroyer. Was laid down: in January 1937. Made up an escort since 28 November to 2 December 1941.
  – destroyer. Was laid down: 13 January 1936. Made up an escort since 28 November to 2 December 1941.
  – cruiser. Made up an escort since 28 November to 3 December 1941.
 Escorts:
  – Was launched in 1938. Made up an escort since 27 to 28 November 1941.
  – Was laid down: 2 November 1936. Made up an escort since 27 November to 10 December 1941. Right down to 10 December escorted 2 Soviet cargo ships (Andre Marti and Revolutionary) to Kirkwall.
  – Was laid down: 28 August 1933. Made up an escort since 27 November to 9 December 1941.
  – Was laid down: 15 February 1937. Made up an escort since 9 December to 12 December 1941.
  – Was laid down: 1 December 1937. Made up an escort since 27 to 28 November 1941.
 Shakespearian-class trawler
  – Made up an escort since 9 December to 12 December 1941. Escorted British cargo ships from Seyðisfjörður to Kirkwall.
  – Made up an escort since 9 December to 12 December 1941. Escorted British cargo ships from Seyðisfjörður to Kirkwall.

References

QP 3